Chimney Rock is an 6,110-foot (1,860 meter) elevation pillar located within the Ute Mountain Tribal Park, in Montezuma County of southwest Colorado. This landmark is situated one mile southeast of the junction of U.S. Route 491 and US 160, and towers 900 feet above the floor of the Mancos River Valley. This geographical feature is also known as Jackson Butte, named for William Henry Jackson (1843–1942), photographer and explorer famous for his images of the American West who visited this area during the Hayden Survey. He was the first to photograph the cliff dwellings in this Mesa Verde region of the Four Corners area.

Geology
Chimney Rock is located on the Colorado Plateau, and is composed of Cretaceous Point Lookout Sandstone, which is the oldest of the three formations that make up the Mesaverde Group which is common to the Mesa Verde region. The cliff-forming Point Lookout Sandstone overlays a pedestal of softer, slope-forming Mancos Shale. Precipitation runoff from this feature drains into the Mancos River watershed.

Gallery

See also
 List of rock formations in the United States

References

External links
 Weather forecast: National Weather Service

Colorado Plateau
Landforms of Montezuma County, Colorado
Buttes of Colorado
North American 1000 m summits